Teklin may refer to the following places:
Teklin, Piotrków County in Łódź Voivodeship (central Poland)
Teklin, Tomaszów Mazowiecki County in Łódź Voivodeship (central Poland)
Teklin, Lublin Voivodeship (east Poland)
Teklin, Greater Poland Voivodeship (west-central Poland)